Iridomyrmex mjobergi is a species of ant in the genus Iridomyrmex. Described by Forel in 1915, the species is among the most common of the genus, endemic to all states and territories in Australia, and even extends into New Guinea. Workers are not usually aggressive, and they have been observed foraging for foods like nectar and honeydew.

References

Iridomyrmex
Hymenoptera of Australia
Insects of New Guinea
Insects described in 1915